Phillip Lopate (born 1943) is an American film critic, essayist, fiction writer, poet, and teacher.  He is the younger brother of radio host Leonard Lopate.

Early life
Phillip Lopate was born in Brooklyn, New York. He graduated with a BA degree from Columbia University in 1964 and received his doctorate from Union Institute & University in 1979. Lopate is the younger brother of Leonard Lopate.

Career

Teaching
Lopate worked as a writer-in-the-schools for twelve years and his memoir Being With Children came out of his association with the artists-in-the-school organization Teachers & Writers Collaborative. Lopate coordinated T&W's first project (at Manhattan's P.S. 75), the model for which led to similar programs in all 50 states.

He has taught creative writing and literature to undergraduate and graduate students at several institutions, including Bennington College, Fordham University, Cooper Union, the University of Houston, New York University (NYU), Columbia University School of the Arts, and The New School. He is currently professor of Writing at Columbia University. He held the Adams Chair at Hofstra University until 2011, where he was professor of English.

Creative writing
Lopate's essays, fiction, and poetry have appeared in several Pushcart Prize annuals, the anthologies Congregation and Testimony, and The Paris Review, Harper's Magazine, Ploughshares, The Threepenny Review, Harvard Educational Review, The New York Times Book Review, Boulevard, The Journal of Contemporary Fiction, Double Take, and Creative Nonfiction, among others.

Travel
Lopate has written for the New York Times Sophisticated Traveler, Conde Nast Traveler, European Travel and Life, Sidestreets of the World, and American Way.

Architecture
Lopate has written about architecture and urbanism for Metropolis, The New York Times, Double Take, Preservation, Cite, and 7 Days, where he wrote a bimonthly architectural column. He has served as a committee member for the Municipal Art Society and as a consultant for Ric Burns' PBS documentary on the history of New York City.

Media critic
He has written about movies for The New York Times, Vogue, Esquire, Film Comment, Film Quarterly, Cinemabook, Threepenny Review, Tikkun, American Film, The Normal School, and the anthology The Movie That Changed My Life, among others. A volume of his selected movie criticism, Totally Tenderly Tragically, was published by Doubleday-Anchor in 1998. He edited a massive anthology of American film criticism from the silent era to present day, entitled American Movie Critics: From Silents Until Now, was published in March 2006 for Library of America.

Awards and fellowships
Lopate has been awarded a John Simon Guggenheim Fellowship, a New York Public Library Center for Scholars and Writers Fellowship, two National Endowment for the Arts grants, and two New York Foundation for the Arts grants. He also received a Christopher Medal for Being With Children, the Texas Institute of Letters award for best non-fiction book of the year (for Bachelorhood), and was a finalist for the Spielvogel-Diamonstein PEN Award for best essay book of the year (for Portrait of My Body). His anthology Writing New York received an honorable mention from the Municipal Art Society's Brendan Gill Award, and a citation from the New York Society Library.  He was also a Lila Wallace Foundation writer-in-residence. He is a Fellow of the American Academy of Arts and Sciences.

Bibliography

Essay collections:
 Bachelorhood (Little, Brown, 1981)
 Against Joie de Vivre (Simon & Schuster, 1989)
 Portrait of My Body (Doubleday-Anchor, 1996)
 Totally Tenderly Tragically (Anchor, 1998)
 Getting Personal (Basic Books, 2003) 
 Notes on Sontag (Princeton University Press, 2009)
 Portrait Inside My Head (Free Press, 2013)
 To Show and to Tell (Free Press, 2013)

Fiction:
 Confessions of Summer (Doubleday, 1979)
 The Rug Merchant (Viking, 1987)
 Two Marriages (Other Press, 2008)

Poetry collections:
 The Eyes Don't Always Want to Stay Open (Sun Press, 1972)
 The Daily Round (Sun Press, 1976)
 At the End of the Day (Marsh Hawk Press, 2010)

Memoir:
 Being With Children (Doubleday, 1975)

Anthologies (as contributor):
 The Best American Short Stories (1974)
 The Best American Essays (1987)

Anthologies (as editor):
 The Art of the Personal Essay (Doubleday-Anchor, 1994) 
 Writing New York (The Library of America, 1998)
 Journal of a Living Experiment (Teachers & Writers Press, 1979)
 The Anchor Essay Annual (Anchor, 1997-9)
 The Phillip Lopate Reader (Basic Books, 2003)
 American Movie Critics (Library of America, 2006)
 The Prince of Minor Writers (New York Review Books, 2015)
 The Glorious American Essay: One Hundred Essays from Colonial Times to the Present (Pantheon, 2020)
 The Golden Age of the American Essay (Anchor, 2021) 
 The Contemporary American Essay (Anchor, 2021)

Non-fiction:
 Waterfront: A Walk Around Manhattan (Anchor, 2005); 
 A Mother's Tale (Mad River Books, 2017)

References

External links

Phillip Lopate's curriculum vitae
Willow Springs interview with Phillip Lopate
2013 Interview on The Lit Show
2013 Bomb Magazine interview of Phillip Lopate by Shifra Sharlin

20th-century American novelists
21st-century American novelists
American male novelists
Columbia College (New York) alumni
Columbia University faculty
Living people
1943 births
American male essayists
20th-century American essayists
21st-century American essayists
20th-century American male writers
21st-century American male writers
Novelists from New York (state)